Baygo is an ethnic group of Sudan. They are one of seven distinct ethnicities comprising the Daju people. Their original language, the Baygo language, is now extinct and the population now speaks Sudanese Arabic. The population of the group numbers 850. They live to the southeast of Nyala, the capital of South Darfur state in the western part of the Sudan. They are mostly Muslim.

References

Ethnic groups in Sudan